S.S. Lazio finished three points above the relegation zone, but were relegated due to involvement in a match-fixing scandal, that also saw Milan being demoted to Serie B.

Squad

Goalkeepers
  Giuseppe Avagliano
  Massimo Cacciatori

Defenders
  Filippo Citterio
  Lionello Manfredonia
  Luigi Martini
  Dario Pighin
  Mauro Tassotti
  Giuseppe Wilson

Midfielders
  Riccardo Cenci
  Vincenzo D'Amico
  Stefano Ferretti
  Antonio Labonia
  Antonio Lopez
  Mauro Manzoni
  Maurizio Montesi
  Salvatore Pesce
  Fernando Viola
  Vincenzo Zucchini

Attackers
  Salvatore Campilongo
  Renzo Garlaschelli
  Bruno Giordano
  Enrico Todesco

Competitions

Serie A

League table

Matches

Coppa Italia

First RoundGroup 5

Quarterfinals

Sources
  RSSSF - Italy Championship 1979/80

S.S. Lazio seasons
Lazio